Joseph E. LeBlanc (May 28, 1916 – May 23, 1979) was a Canadian politician. He served in the Legislative Assembly of New Brunswick from 1952 to 1974 as member of the Liberal party.

References

1916 births
1979 deaths
New Brunswick Liberal Association MLAs